David James McGoldrick (born 29 November 1987) is a professional footballer who plays as a striker for  club Derby County. He won 14 caps for the Republic of Ireland national team between 2014 and 2020, scoring one international goal. 

A trainee at Notts County, he made his senior debut in 2004, before being signed by Southampton later in the year. He spent five years with the "Saints", also playing on loan for Notts County in 2005, and both AFC Bournemouth and Port Vale in 2007. He transferred to Nottingham Forest in 2009 for a £1 million fee. He joined Sheffield Wednesday on loan in September 2011, and was loaned out to Coventry City in August 2012. After a successful spell at Coventry he joined Ipswich Town in July 2013 following an initial loan period, and stayed with the club for a further five seasons before being released after his contract expired in the summer of 2018. He signed with Sheffield United in July 2018 and was named as the club's Player of the Year as they secured promotion into the Premier League in the 2018–19 season. He was released after four years and went on to sign with Derby County in July 2022.

Club career

Notts County
McGoldrick was born in Nottingham, and graduated through the Notts County youth squad to make his senior debut on 24 January 2004, in a Second Division clash with Swindon Town at Meadow Lane. He replaced Frazer McHugh with minutes to go of a 2–1 defeat. He won his first start on 14 February, playing 86 minutes of a 1–0 loss at AFC Bournemouth. He made two further appearances in 2003–04, at the end of which County were relegated into the Third Division.

Southampton
In August 2004, at the age of sixteen, he was signed by Southampton for an undisclosed fee. Leon Best also made the move from Notts County to Southampton over the summer. McGoldrick did not feature in the 2004–05 Premier League campaign. He was though a member of Southampton's youth team that reached the final of the FA Youth Cup in 2005, losing on aggregate to Ipswich Town.

On 20 September 2005, he made his "Saints" debut as a substitute in a 1–0 League Cup defeat to Mansfield Town, having replaced Dexter Blackstock on 81 minutes. Four days later he returned to Notts County for a one-month loan spell, in to gain more first team experience. On his return to Southampton he scored 44 goals for the Reserves and Under-18 teams, bagging a hat-trick in the Under-18s play-off final win over Aston Villa, as well as three goals over the two legs of the FA Youth Cup semi-final against Liverpool. These feats earned him a league debut for the club at home to Millwall on 17 April. He was replaced by Ricardo Fuller after 61 minutes. He scored his first goal for the club on 19 September 2006, in a 4–0 win over Millwall in the League Cup.

Loan to AFC Bournemouth
In February 2007, he joined League One team Bournemouth on a one-month loan. The loan was later extended until the end of the season, but an injury-hit Southampton recalled McGoldrick on 23 April. He maintained a record of a goal every other game for Bournemouth, having struck six times in twelve games. His efforts helped the club to avoid relegation into League Two.

Loan to Port Vale
However his first team opportunities remained limited at Southampton, and so in August 2007 he joined Martin Foyle's Port Vale on loan until January 2008. He went on to score twice in eighteen games for the "Valiants" in 2007–08, though was unable to save them from relegation. Back at Southampton he found himself behind Stern John, Marek Saganowski and Bradley Wright-Phillips in the pecking order, and therefore considered quitting the club.

Return to Southampton
McGoldrick rarely featured under George Burley or Nigel Pearson, but managed to force his way into the first-team regularly under youth-focused Dutch managers Jan Poortvliet and Mark Wotte. After an impressive pre-season, which included two goals against Premier League side West Ham United, McGoldrick scored his first league goal for the "Saints" in a 2–1 defeat to Cardiff City on 9 August 2008. This was followed three days later by another two goals in a League Cup victory over Exeter City.

After four goals in four games at the start of the 2008–09 campaign, he signed a new three–year contract with Southampton in September. An ever-present throughout the season, he scored fourteen goals in fifty appearances to finish as the club's top-scroer. However Southampton were relegated and faced a financial crisis; which meant that McGoldrick was expected to move away from St Mary's.

Nottingham Forest

In June 2009, he joined Nottingham Forest for a fee of £1 million, signing a four-year contract. He faced competition from numerous other strikers at his new club. McGoldrick made his Forest debut against Reading at the Madejski Stadium on 8 August. He scored his first goal for Forest away at Queens Park Rangers two weeks later. However, he endured a disappointing 2009–10, scoring just three league goals in eighteen starts and seventeen substitute appearances.

After undergoing a shoulder operation in the 2010–11 pre-season, he was out of action until late September. He recovered to post six goals that season, and also pushed Forest back into the play-off picture when he came off the bench to score twice past Burnley on 12 April. However, he could not prevent his team from exiting the play-offs at the semi-final stage, after a 3–1 loss to eventual play-off winners Swansea City.

Loan to Sheffield Wednesday
On 15 September 2011, McGoldrick joined Sheffield Wednesday on an emergency one-month loan. Two days later he scored on his Owls debut away at Yeovil Town. He returned to Nottingham having made four appearances for Wednesday.

Loan to Coventry City
On 31 August 2012, McGoldrick joined League One club Coventry City on loan until 2 January 2013. He opened his account for the "Sky Blues" at the Ricoh Arena with consolation goals in 2–1 home defeats to Stevenage and Carlisle United. On 6 October, he scored the only goal in a 1–0 home win against Bournemouth. After a goal in a 4–0 win against York City in the Football League Trophy, McGoldrick then scored two in a 2–2 draw against Swindon Town. McGoldrick then scored the first goal in a 2–1 away defeat to Brentford, and followed that up with the winner in a 1–0 win over Leyton Orient – his performance against Orient earned him a place on the League One team of the week. By the end of the calendar year he had scored 17 goals for Coventry, becoming the division's leading scorer and winning the League One Player of the Month award for December.

Ipswich Town

On 4 January 2013, McGoldrick joined Mick McCarthy's Ipswich Town on loan until the end of the 2012–13 season, with a view to permanent move in the summer. He made his debut for Ipswich on 5 January 2013, coming on as a second-half substitute in a 1–2 away loss to Aston Villa in an FA Cup third round tie. On 2 February, he scored his first goal for Ipswich in a 4–0 home win against Middlesbrough. McGoldrick scored 4 goals in 14 appearances during his loan spell at Ipswich.

McGoldrick agreed to sign a two-year deal with Ipswich in July 2013. He formed at a strong partnership with Daryl Murphy at Portman Road during the 2013–14 season, as the pair netted 18 goals in 22 games in the first half of the campaign. He was named as Championship Player of the Month for September 2013 after scoring braces against Middlesbrough and Brighton & Hove Albion. However, he was struck down for ten weeks with a partial tear of the medial ligament in his right knee in mid-February. He finished the season as Ipswich's top goalscorer, scoring 16 goals in 34 appearances in all competitions. He was voted Ipswich's Players' Player of the Year at the end of the campaign.

He returned to fitness just before the start of the 2014–15 season, and marked his return to the first team with the winning goal against Fulham on 9 August. Newly promoted Premier League club Leicester City placed an initial £5 million bid for the striker during the close of the summer transfer window, but Ipswich held out for a sum of £8 million and Leicester decided to pull out of the deal. He was a key part of Ipswich's side during the first-half of the season, before getting injured in February. He missed the second-half of the season with a recurring thigh problem, only managing to return for the final 20 minutes of the play-off semi-final second leg defeat to East Anglian rivals Norwich City at Carrow Road on 16 May.

He signed a contract extension in August 2015 to keep himself tied to the club until summer 2018. He scored his first goal of the 2015–16 season on 18 August, netting in a 2–0 home win against Burnley. McGoldrick struggled with niggling injuries in the first half of the 2015–16 campaign, and then picked up a "nasty tear" in his hamstring in December. The injury kept him out of action for four months. In total, he made 27 appearances during the season, scoring 5 goals. McGoldrick scored his first goal of the 2016–17 campaign on the opening day of the season, scoring a penalty in a 4–2 home win against Barnsley at Portman Road. He went on to score five goals in 31 games in the 2016–17 season.

He made a strong start the following season, scoring a brace in a 2–0 win against Luton Town in a EFL Cup first round tie on 8 August, his first appearance of the 2017–18 season. He then scored in the following league match against Barnsley in a 2–1 away win. Speaking about McGoldrick in January 2018, McCarthy stated that "he is an obvious target. None of us want to lose him but we'll see what happens" after the club reportedly put a £500,000 price tag on his potential transfer, with the player out of contract in the summer. However he stayed put and ended up picking up a groin injury the following month, which kept him out of action for the rest of the 2017–18 season. McGoldrick scored 8 goals in 24 appearances during an injury hit season in 2017–18

After 5 years at Ipswich, in which we scored 45 goals in 159 appearances, McGoldrick's departure from the club was confirmed by new manager Paul Hurst on 25 June 2018, following the end of his contract.

Sheffield United
On 24 July 2018, McGoldrick signed a one-year contract with Championship side Sheffield United after impressing manager Chris Wilder during a one-week trial period. On 29 September, he scored twice in a 3–2 win at Millwall and was named on the EFL team of the week. On 25 January, Sheffield United announced that McGoldrick had signed a contract extension with them. On 22 April, he scored a brace in a 3–0 victory over Hull City at KCOM Stadium and was again named in the EFL team of the week. He featured only in league matches during the 2018–19 campaign, and was named as the club's Player of the Year as his 15 goals in 44 appearances helped to secure promotion out of the Championship.

McGoldrick suffered a long domestic goal drought in the 2019–20 season, which he ended by opening the scoring in a 2–1 win at Reading in the fifth round of the FA Cup on 3 March. In the league though, it was reported that Opta Sports statistics showed no Premier League player had ever managed 36 shots on target or had an expected goals rating of 6.2 without finding the net; in a positive light, "Didzy", as Sheffield United supporters called him, had made 36 tackles per game, more than any other regular Premier League forward that season. During his run he missed an open goal against Brighton & Hove Albion and had a goal against Tottenham Hotspur at White Hart Lane ruled out for offside by the video assistant referee. On 13 June, Sheffield United announced that McGoldrick had signed a contract extension with them. On 11 July, he scored his first Premier League goals with a brace in a 3–0 home win over Chelsea.

On 17 December 2020, McGoldrick scored two goals in a 3–2 home defeat to Manchester United that left Sheffield United bottom of the Premier League with just one point and said that the team had to stay positive despite their poor start to the season. He scored nine goals from 40 games in the 2020–21 season, including eight Premier League goals, to become the club's top-scorer. He won the club's  Players’ Player of the Year and Goal of the Season awards, with his strike against Arsenal at the Emirates Stadium winning the fans' vote. However the season was a poor one for the club, as Wilder left and Sheffield United were relegated in last place under caretaker-manager Paul Heckingbottom.

He started the 2021–22 season poorly under Slaviša Jokanović. He then was sidelined with a thigh injury picked up in February. Nevertheless he acted as a "father figure" for young players such as Rhian Brewster and Jayden Bogle. Having been limited to two goals in 21 appearances during the season, he was released upon the expiry of his contract in the summer.

Derby County
On 6 July 2022, McGoldrick joined League One club Derby County on a one-year contract. On 29 October, he scored a first-half hat-trick to secure Paul Warne's first home win as Derby manager in a 4–2 win over Bristol Rovers at Pride Park. It was his first career hat-trick. He scored another hat-trick on 17 December, during a 4–0 home victory over Forest Green Rovers. He scored a third hat-trick of the season on 4 February, in a 5–0 home win over Morecambe. He won the League One Player of the Month award for February 2023 after scoring six goals and providing three assists.

International career
In 2014, McGoldrick – who is adopted – discovered that he was eligible to play for Ireland after researching his family tree and finding that he had a biological grandfather born in Ireland. McGoldrick turned down an approach by Scotland manager Gordon Strachan to play for that country, stating he would prefer to play for Ireland, and Ipswich manager Mick McCarthy encouraged McGoldrick to represent the "Boys In Green". Ipswich teammates Stephen Hunt and Daryl Murphy backed McGoldrick for an Ireland call-up. In August 2014, Ireland manager Martin O'Neill confirmed that McGoldrick was in his plans, subject to paperwork.

On 10 November 2014, McGoldrick received his first call up to the Irish squad for the games against Scotland and the United States. He made his debut for Ireland in a 4–1 win over the United States on 18 November 2014, providing two assists for Anthony Pilkington and Robbie Brady goals.

McGoldrick scored his first goal for the Republic of Ireland on 5 September 2019, scoring the equaliser in a 1–1 draw with Switzerland at the Aviva Stadium in Dublin in a UEFA Euro 2020 qualifying match.

In August 2020, McGoldrick was named as the 2019 FAI Senior International Player of the Year. He announced his retirement from international football three months later on 4 November, citing a wish to spend more time with his family and to focus more on his club career.

Style of play

Personal life
McGoldrick was a father of four children by 2022.

Career statistics

Club

International
Source:

Scores and results list Republic of Ireland's goal tally first, score column indicates score after each McGoldrick goal.

Honours
Sheffield United
EFL Championship second-place promotion: 2018–19

Individual
Ipswich Town Players' Player of the Year: 2013–14
Sheffield United Player of the Year: 2018–19
Sheffield United Players' Player of the Year: 2020–21
Sheffield United Goal of the Season: 2020–21
FAI Senior International Player of the Year: 2019

See also
List of Republic of Ireland international footballers born outside the Republic of Ireland

References

External links

1987 births
Living people
Footballers from Nottingham
English footballers
Republic of Ireland association footballers
Republic of Ireland international footballers
Association football forwards
Notts County F.C. players
Southampton F.C. players
AFC Bournemouth players
Port Vale F.C. players
Nottingham Forest F.C. players
Sheffield Wednesday F.C. players
Coventry City F.C. players
Ipswich Town F.C. players
Sheffield United F.C. players
Derby County F.C. players
English Football League players
Premier League players
English adoptees
Black British sportspeople
Black Irish sportspeople
English people of Irish descent